Slobodan "Boda" Ninković (born 25 November 1956 in Smederevo) is a Serbian actor. He is known for his work in the films Ulysses' Gaze, The Crusaders and We Are Not Angels. He starred in the popular television series Otvorena vrata, Naša mala klinika and Senke nad Balkanom.

Considered a dedicated and hard-working method actor, Ninković is also known for his work ethic and prolific stance in theatre. He has performed in the National Theatre in Belgrade, Atelje 212, the Boško Buha Theatre, the Zvezdara Theatre and the Yugoslav Drama Theatre. In his theatre repertoire, he has appeared over three thousand times on stage, including performing in two different theatres two different plays at the same time (Ona voli Mambo in the Bitef Theatre and Grobljanska in the Zvezdara Theatre). He is widely called "a legend of Smederevo" by critics, actors, historians, writers and academics.

Career
An alumnus of the Faculty of Dramatic Arts in Belgrade, he was a member of the most successful class in the history of the university, nicknamed "the turbo-class". The twelve-student class of 1984, led by Vladimir Jevtović has spawned one of the most established and prolific actors in Serbian theatre, television and film, including Dragan Bjelogrlić, Vesna Trivalić, Srđan Todorović, Mirjana Joković, Milorad Mandić, Vesna Stanojević, Dušanka Stojanović, Dragan Petrović, Branka Pujić, Darko Tomović, Tatjana Venčelovski and Ninković, respectively.

Best known for his versatile and wide range in theatre, he is prominent for both his comedic and dramatic roles in the National Theatre in Belgrade, Atelje 212, the Boško Buha Theatre, the Zvezdara Theatre and the Yugoslav Drama Theatre, including modern repertoire and classic works by Racine, Shakespeare, Dostoyevski, Tolstoy, A. P. Chekhov, Faulkner, Homer and Moliere.

He has appeared in over fifty films, starring in over twenty of them. Among his notable credits stand Ulysses' Gaze, The Crusaders, We Are Not Angels, Sveti Georgije ubiva aždahu and San zimske noći. He has starred in the commercially and critically successful cult classic televised series as Otvorena vrata, Naša mala klinika and Senke nad Balkanom. He appeared in supporting roles in the series Bolji život and Folk. He was also the presenter of Beovizija 2007.

He has also worked prominently in radio and animation. He is the official Serbian voice dub for Goofy. He also voiced Tantor in the Serbian dub of Tarzan, Philoctetes in the Serbian dub of Hercules, Li Shan in the Serbian dub of Kung Fu Panda 3 and Smokey in Cars 3.

His autobiography Slušaj sine ove velike reči, written by Jovica Tišma, was released in February 2019. His book Sin moj is set to be released 2021.

Filmography

References

1956 births
Living people
20th-century Serbian male actors
21st-century Serbian male actors
21st-century Serbian writers
Serbian male film actors
Serbian male stage actors
Serbian male television actors
Serbian male voice actors
People from Smederevo